Thomas Grove (c. 1609–1692) was an English MP for Milborne Port (1645–1648), Wiltshire (1654–1658), Marlborough (1659), Shaftesbury (1660–1661).

Thomas Grove may also refer to:

Thomas Grove (MP for Wallingford), 14th-century MP for Wallingford (UK Parliament constituency)
 Thomas Newcomen Archibald Grove (1855–1920), British MP for West Ham North (1892–1895) and for South Northamptonshire (1900–1906)
 Sir Thomas Grove, 1st Baronet (1823–1897), British MP for South Wiltshire (1865–1874) and for Wilton (1885–1892)